Zhuolu may refer to:

Zhuolu County, in Hebei, China
Zhuolu Town, seat of Zhuolu County
Site of the Battle of Zhuolu, in the 26th century BC between the Yellow Emperor and Chi You